Toomas Uba (2 November 1943 – 31 December 2000) was an Estonian sports journalist.

He was born in Tallinn. In 1968, he graduated from Tartu State University with a degree in journalism.

From 1962 until 1972, he worked as a sports reporter for Eesti Raadio. Since 1973, he worked at Eesti Televisioon's (ETV) sport section; since 1978, the chief editor and since 1999, its main producer.

Awards:
 1988 Merited Journalist of Estonian SSR
 1998 Valdo Pant's Award
 1998 annual prize of Cultural Endowment of Estonia

References

1943 births
2000 deaths
Estonian journalists
Estonian sportspeople
University of Tartu alumni
Sportspeople from Tallinn